NAMFI can refer to:

 Namibian Maritime and Fisheries Institute, Namibia
 NATO Missile Firing Installation, Crete, Greece